Pedro Ruiz  may refer to:

Pedro Ruiz de Azagra (died 1186), Navarrese nobleman and soldier
Pedro Ruiz de Villegas II (1304–1355), Spanish noble baron
Pedro Ruíz Corredor (16th century), Spanish conquistador
Pedro Ruiz de Velasco (1915–1996), Mexican businessman
Pedro Ruiz Gallo (1838–1880), Peruvian polymath
Pedro Ruiz Martínez and Odilia Pineda, Mexican husband and wife potters
Pedro Ruiz Carrilero, a professional Valencian pilota player
Pedro Ruiz (actor) (born 1947), Spanish radio presenter, actor, screenwriter and comedian
Pedro Ruiz (artist), Colombian artist
Pedro Ruíz (footballer, born 1947), Peruvian footballer
Pedro Ruiz (footballer, born 2000), Spanish footballer